The 1984-85 French Rugby Union Championship was won by Toulouse that beat Toulon in the final.

Formula 

The 40 clubs were divided in four pools of ten.

The two best team in each pool were admitted directly into "last 16", while the teams classified from 3rd to 6th played a barrage.

Qualification round 
The teams are listed as the ranking, in bold the teams admitted directly to "last 16" round.

Knockout stages

Barrage 
In bold the clubs qualified for the next round

"Last 16" 

In bold the clubs qualified for the next round

Quarter of finals 
In bold the clubs qualified for the next round

Semifinals

Final 

It was the first Bouclier de Brennus won by Toulouse from 1947,

External links
 Compte rendu finale de 1985 lnr.fr

1985
France 1985
Championship